Field theory had its origins in the 18th century in a mathematical formulation of Newtonian mechanics, but it was seen as deficient as it implied action at a distance. In 1852, Michael Faraday treated the magnetic field as a physical object, reasoning about lines of force. James Clerk Maxwell used Faraday's conceptualisation to help formulate his unification of electricity and magnetism in his electromagnetic theory.

With Albert Einstein's special relativity and the Michelson–Morley experiment, it became clear that electromagnetic waves did not travel as vibrations in a physical aether; and there was in Einstein's physics no difference between the effects of a field and action at a distance.

In quantum field theory, fields become the fundamental objects of study, and particles are excitations of these fields.

Historical context

Field theory, the study of dynamical fields in physics, was originally a mathematical formulation of Newtonian mechanics. The success of Newtonian physics since the publication of Isaac Newton's Principia in 1687 provided a framework with which to investigate the motion and forces associated with electricity and magnetism. Charles-Augustin de Coulomb showed in 1785 that the repulsive force between two electrically charged spheres obeys the same (up to a sign) force law as Newton's law of universal gravitation: the force between two bodies is directed along the line separating the bodies and its magnitude is proportional to the product of their charges (for gravitation, their masses) divided by the square of their distance apart. André-Marie Ampère showed in 1823 that the force between infinitesimal lengths of current-carrying wires similarly obeys an inverse-square law such that the force is directed along the line of separation between the wire elements.

Despite the success of these theories in making accurate numerical predictions of a wide range of phenomena, they were generally seen as deficient as natural philosophies of mechanics, since they were all essentially action-at-a-distance mechanisms. In the context of the development of field theory, the fact that a function could be written to give the force per unit mass, charge, or current for each point in space was just a mathematical construct. It was seen as untenable on metaphysical grounds that a force be exerted across empty space, and hence these force laws were assumed to be merely descriptive and not explanatory.

To explain the apparent action-at-a-distance and provide mechanics with a grounding in metaphysics, in 1786 Immanuel Kant proposed a more general definition of matter:

"Matter is whatever is movable and fills a space. To fill a space means to resist every ·other· movable thing that tries to move into that space. A space that is not filled is an empty space."

Because this definition is very broad, it is unclear whether Kant had in mind for his "matter" the same sort of field Michael Faraday would discover. Kant himself was a proponent of the aether theory, which is mentioned in his Opus Postumum. But in whatever capacity Kant's metaphysics actually predicates the discoveries of Faraday and James Clerk Maxwell, it represented one of the first efforts to reconcile action-at-a-distance on physical rather than mathematical grounds.

Electromagnetic field 

The discovery of a field as a physical object begins with Michael Faraday. Faraday coined the term "magnetic field" in his Researches when postulating, after discovering that all the constituent materials of a human are diamagnetic, that if a human were set in a sufficiently strong magnetic field then they too would align with the field. Faraday did not conceive of this field as a mere mathematical construct for calculating the forces between particles—having only rudimentary mathematical training, he had no use for abstracting reality to make quantitative predictions. Instead he conjectured that there was "force" filling the space where electromagnetic fields were generated and reasoned qualitatively about these forces with "force lines:"

"Important to the definition of these lines is that they represent a determinate and unchanging amount of force. Though, therefore, their forms, as they exist between two or more centers or sources of power, may vary greatly, and also the space through which they may be traced, yet the sum of power contained in any one section of a given portion of the lines is exactly equal to the sum of power in any other section of the same lines, however altered in form or however convergent or divergent they may be at the second place."

Faraday's insights into the behavior of magnetic fields would prove invaluable to James Clerk Maxwell's course to unite electricity and magnetism into one theory. Prior to writing his Treatise, Maxwell began to use Faraday's lines to reason about electromagnetic behavior, and started to believe in their physical existence:

"The beautiful illustration of the presence of magnetic force afforded by this experiment ([iron filings aligning in a magnetic field]), naturally tends to make us think of the lines of force as something real, and as indicating something more than the mere resultant of two forces, whose seat of action is at a distance, and which do not exist there at all until a magnet is placed in that part of the field. We are dissatisfied with the explanation founded on the hypothesis of attractive and repellent forces directed towards the magnetic poles, even though we may have satisfied ourselves that the phenomenon is in strict accordance with that hypothesis, and we cannot help thinking that in every place where we find these lines of force, some physical state or action must exist in sufficient energy to produce the actual phenomena."

But even after his Treatise and subsequent discovery of light as an electromagnetic wave, Maxwell continued to believe in the aether theory:

"Another theory of electricity which I prefer denies action at a distance and attributes electric action to tensions and pressures in an all-pervading medium, these stresses being the same in kind with those familiar to engineers, and the medium being identical with that in which light is supposed to be propagated."

This was viewed as a desirable feature for a physical description to have, as it would make no reference to actions at distances. In her book detailing the history of the concept of action at a distance, the philosopher of science Mary Hesse writes:

"There is a physical difference between a gravitational field ... and the velocity field of a fluid. In the latter case the field function is an actual property of material at every point of the field, but in the gravitational case the potential function V is 'potential' in the sense that it does not necessarily describe a material property of the field ... it describes a potential property, namely, the force that would be exerted if a small mass were introduced into the field at that point."

But the discovery of special relativity and the subsequent Michelson–Morley experiment conclusively demonstrated that an aether whose motion as a fluid would explain the effects of electromagnetism could not exist, as Einstein explained:

"Recapitulating, we may say that according to the general theory of relativity space is endowed with physical qualities; in this sense, therefore, there exists an ether. According to the general theory of relativity space without ether is unthinkable; for in such space there not only would be no propagation of light, but also no possibility of existence for standards of space and time (measuring-rods and clocks), nor therefore any space-time intervals in the physical sense. But this ether may not be thought of as endowed with the quality characteristic of ponderable media, as consisting of parts which may be tracked through time. The idea of motion may not be applied to it."

Hence it was made clear that in the case of electromagnetism there is no underlying material through which the forces must propagate. In these cases there can be no distinction made between the effects of a field arising through a potential and the effects of an "action at a distance" force; they are mathematically equivalent and cannot predict different phenomena from which one or the other perspective may be falsified. In the regime of classical physics, there is a fundamental duality between action at a distance and field effects.

Quantum fields and the Unruh effect 

Fields become the fundamental object of study in quantum field theory. Mathematically, quantum fields are formalized as operator-valued distributions. Although there is no direct method of measuring the fields themselves, the framework asserts that all particles are "excitations" of these fields. For example: whereas Maxwell's theory of classical electromagnetism describes light as a self-propagating wave in the electromagnetic field, in quantum electrodynamics light is the massless gauge boson particle called the "photon." Furthermore, the number of particles in an isolated system need not be conserved; an example of a process for which this is the case is bremsstrahlung. A heuristic for suggesting particles may be created and destroyed is found in Albert Einstein's famous equation , which asserts that energy and matter may in principle be exchanged. A more detailed understanding of the framework is obtained by studying the Lagrangian density of a field theory which encodes the information of its allowed particle interactions.

But even in this framework for which there is no action-at-a-distance contention as with classical fields, quantum fields may be thought of as merely mathematical tools for calculation of particle dynamics. In 1972, it was still a matter of taste and convenience to decide how one would like to understand quantum mechanics; Julian Schwinger remarked that:

"Eventually, [development of mathematical formalism] led to Lagrangian or action formulations of quantum mechanics, appearing in two distinct but related forms, which I distinguish as differential and integral. The latter, spearheaded by Feynman, has had all the press coverage, but I continue to believe that the differential viewpoint is more general, more elegant, more useful, and more tied to the historical line of development as the quantum transcription of Hamilton's action principle."

An investigation by Stephen Fulling into quantum field theory on a curved spacetime background yielded the perplexing result that there was an ambiguity in the definition of the vacuum state whose resolution would yield physically significant conclusions. William Unruh investigated and resolved this ambiguity for Stephen Hawking's problem of a divergent density of ultraviolet particles near the event horizon of a black hole. He considered a toy model of a particle detector accelerating uniformly through the vacuum state of a quantum field in Minkowski space (for which there is no ambiguity). The conditions he specified were:

 "A particle detector will react to states which have positive frequency with respect to the detector's proper time, not with respect to any universal time."  
 "The process of detection of a field quanta by a detector, defined as the exciting of the detector by the field, may correspond to either the absorption or the emission of a field quanta when the detector is a accelerated one."

The result he found for his toy model was that the detector accelerating at constant rate  would detect black-body radiation, a flow of photons as if it were set stationary in a thermal bath of temperature . The application to Hawking's problem was that by the equivalence principle, a stationary observer near the event horizon of a black hole carrying a particle detector would observe excitations in the detector as if it were accelerating at an enormous rate in an otherwise vacuum-state flat spacetime. This accounts for the divergent density of UV particles near the event horizon.

To understand why the quantum field must be the fundamental object of study in relativistic quantum mechanics:

"If one views the local fields as the fundamental objects in the theory, the Unruh effect is seen to be a simple consequence of how these fields interact with other quantum mechanical systems (i.e., "particle detectors"). If one attempts to view "particles" as the fundamental entities in the theory, the Unruh effect becomes incomprehensible." 

In this sense, quantum fields assert themselves in a manner that classical fields do not. The fact that an accelerated reference frame has a different notion of time (Rindler coordinates) means it will have a different notion of energy, particles, and vacuum. The connection between such notions is understood only in the context of field theory.

Notes

References 

History of physics
Philosophy of physics